Danny Reet (born 31 January 1987, in Sheffield) is an English footballer.

Reet is a striker, and a graduate of Sheffield Wednesday's youth academy after a yearlong spell at Sheffield Wednesday's local rivals Sheffield United. He never made it to the Owls' first-team but had an excellent goalscoring record for their reserve team. In November 2005, he was loaned to Bury, where he scored four times in six games – including two goals against Mansfield, whom he later joined. 
Reet scored five goals in 18 appearances for the Stags in 2005–06.
Reet went on loan to Rochdale on 24 March 2007 and made a handful of substitute appearances before returning to Mansfield Town.
Reet went on loan to Alfreton Town on 14 September 2007.
His Mansfield Town contract was cancelled on the free transfer deadline, 27 March 2008, enabling him to find a new club. He signed for Dinnington Town for the 2008–09 season. Danny has now signed for Buxton F.C.

He now works as a Manager at Capita PLC but regularly turns out for Sheffield Meadowhall Sunday League Division 1 pace setters Arbourthorne EA. During the 2012–13 season, as at 22 March 2013, "Arbour" have won 18 out of 19 games they have played, losing only 1 game in over a year and Reet has formed a formidable forward line partnership with veteran Dinnington Town striker Liam Cartledge. Between them they have netted 41 times with Reet contributing 12 of those.

Danny now manages a U11 team with Pilsley Community FC.

Family
Danny has a son called Kai Daniel Reet born on 19 October 2007.

References

External links

Profile at Buxton F.C. website

1987 births
Living people
English footballers
Footballers from Sheffield
Dinnington Town F.C. players
Association football forwards
English Football League players
Sheffield Wednesday F.C. players
Bury F.C. players
Mansfield Town F.C. players
Rochdale A.F.C. players
Alfreton Town F.C. players
Buxton F.C. players